Petersberg is a municipality in the Saalekreis district, Saxony-Anhalt, Germany. In January 2010 it absorbed the former municipalities Brachstedt, Götschetal, Krosigk, Kütten, Morl and Ostrau.

Geography 
The municipality Petersberg consists of the following 11 Ortschaften or municipal divisions:

Brachstedt
Gutenberg
Krosigk
Kütten
Morl
Nehlitz
Ostrau
Petersberg
Sennewitz
Teicha
Wallwitz

References

 
Saalekreis